Paul Turner (born c. 1924) is a former American football coach.  He was the tenth head football coach at Northwest Missouri State University in Maryville, Missouri, serving two seasons, from 1958 to 1959, and compiling a record of 3–11–2.

Head coaching record

References

American football placekickers
Kansas Jayhawks football players
Northwest Missouri State Bearcats football coaches
Washburn Ichabods football coaches
People from Johnson County, Kansas
1920s births
Year of birth uncertain

Possibly living people